is a Japanese private university, located in Sakata, Yamagata, Japan.

History
Koeki University (The Tohoku University of Community Service and Science) was established in 2001 by the prefectural government of Yamagata Prefecture, and 14 municipalities in the Shonai region of northwestern Yamagata, with the assistance of Keio University in Tokyo. A graduate program was established in 2005 and a research institute in 2006. A doctoral program was established in 2007.

External links
 Official website

Educational institutions established in 2001
Private universities and colleges in Japan
Universities and colleges in Yamagata Prefecture
2001 establishments in Japan
Sakata, Yamagata